Endoclita chalybeatus is a species of moth of the family Hepialidae. It is known from India. Food plants for this species include Gmelina, Tectona, and Theobroma.

References

External links
Hepialidae genera

Moths described in 1879
Hepialidae